The 2007–08 Liga Super also known as the TM Liga Super for sponsorship reasons is the fifth season of the Liga Super, the top-tier professional football league in Malaysia.

The season was held from 18 November 2007 and concluded on 13 August 2008.

The Liga Super champions for 2007–08 was Kedah.

Teams competing
Kedah
Perak
DPMM
Terengganu
PDRM
Perlis
Johor FC
Selangor
Pahang
Penang
Negeri Sembilan
Sarawak
UPB-MyTeam

Note

League table

Champions

Season statistics

Top scorers

See also
 List of Liga Super seasons

References

Malaysia Super League seasons
1
1
Malaysia